Family History Centers (FHCs) are branches of the Family History Library in Salt Lake City, Utah, operated by the Church of Jesus Christ of Latter-day Saints (LDS Church). The centers supply resources for research and study of genealogy and family history. As of 2020, there are more than 5,100 FHCs in 145 countries.

The smallest FHCs are targeted toward people living within the boundaries of individual congregations, known as wards and branches. Larger administrative areas such as stakes and districts may house a FHC for their constituent wards/branches, or may share a facility with multiple stakes/districts in their area. Regional FHCs are usually "library class" facilities designated as true branch libraries of the Salt Lake City Family History Library (FHL). FHCs with established hours of operation are open to members of the LDS Church and nonmembers alike.

In 2020, the FHCs in the United States were closed in response to the coronavirus pandemic.

Ward, stake and multi-stake Family History Centers
FHCs vary greatly in size, hours staffed, and resources available. Because of changing demographics, many smaller FHCs are closing with their resources being directed into "Library Class" facilities similar to the Los Angeles Family History Library, but not like the Riverton FamilySearch Center that has computers only.

Because most of the Family History Library film/fiche assets have been converted to digital images, microfilm distribution services ended on September 1, 2017.  After that time access to microfilm/microfiche is restricted to the Internet or to collections already at the FHC or Family History Centers.

Most of the larger Family History Centers provide some type of free access to a number of online subscription databases (e.g., Ancestry.com). Mid-range FHCs may have small local book collections.

Ward FHC
The "Ward FHC" is the smallest, consists of at least one computer, related family history programs, most likely Internet access, and has the most variable hours per week because it has a volunteer staff. The ward (single congregation) FHC may or may not have a dedicated room in the ward building ("meetinghouse"), because most buildings are designed for multiple use. Such an FHC may or may not have microfilm or microfiche readers.

Stake FHC
The "Stake FHC," which typically serves six or more ward or branch units (congregations), is the next in size and consists of two or more computers, related family history programs, Internet access, and usually offers more hours per week of service than does the ward FHC. Stake FHCs may have a small collection of CDs, books, and local historical materials. A Stake FHC usually has a dedicated room staffed by volunteers. Most have microfilm or microfiche readers, but no longer have the ability to receive film/fiches from the Salt Lake City Family History Library (FHL).

Multi-stake FHC
The "Multi-Stake FHC" serves two or more stake units consisting of eight or more wards and/or branches (congregations). These have larger dedicated areas within a stake center building, or other building, for the use of the FHC. These larger FHCs have dedicated book, microfilm, and microfiche areas. They have six or more computers with phone line, cable, or satellite Internet access, family history software, and often offer the institutional version of Ancestry.com, Fold3.com, and some other paid-access sites. All have microfilm or microfiche readers, but no longer have the ability to receive film/fiches from the Salt Lake City FHL. Most have local area family history material, but are not "Library Class" facilities.

Regional FamilySearch Libraries
The "Regional FamilySearch Libraries" of the Salt Lake City Family History Library are considered "library class" facilities. Each has a dedicated internal server and a library catalogs or card catalogs or online catalog for its collection. In 2010, the regional branch libraries were re-designated as "Large Multi-Stake FHCs" on the FamilySearch.org website. However a supplement to the Family History Center Operations Guide dated January 5, 2006, renamed these FHCs officially. Supervision of these facilities is under each area presidency or assigned to a member of the Presidency of the Seventy. These facilities are still considered branches of the Salt Lake City central library and often have book collections in the thousands, microfilm and microfiches in the tens of thousands, dozens of Internet-connected computers, microfilm and microfiche readers, and some digital scanners. All have dedicated servers with DSL, cable or T-1 Internet access. In addition, all had at least one multi-use classroom, and several research areas.

These branch libraries have a dedicated unpaid full-time director or a pair of directors (usually a husband-wife team) and dozens of volunteer staff members. In many cases non-church member volunteers from the community serve. Local genealogy groups often support these library facilities to the extent that the centers see non-LDS patron usage higher than local LDS usage.  While the LDS Church has renamed most of them, some legacy websites reflect older names.

BYU Family History Library
The BYU Family History Library is part of the Harold B. Lee Library at Brigham Young University (BYU) in Provo, Utah. The BYU Family History Library was one of the original planned FHCs and is the largest Family History Center outside of Salt Lake City.  It was formerly known as the Utah Valley Regional Family History Center. It is now semi-independent of the LDS FHC system.

FamilySearch Library
In June 2010, the LDS Church closed down many smaller FHCs in the Salt Lake Valley and opened the Riverton FamilySearch Library, a misnomer, since the facility has no books and no magazines, having computers only. Whether this will be a trend for future FHCs is not known. The Riverton FamilySearch Library in Riverton, Utah has a Family Story Room available for use to record ancestor and family stories with state-of-the-art audio and video technology.

History
The Salt Lake City Genealogical Library was founded in 1894 to gather genealogical records and assist members of The Church of Jesus Christ of Latter-day Saints with their family history and genealogical research. It is the largest library of its kind in the world. It is open to the general public at no charge. The Family History Library is visited by an estimated 1,900 or more individual patrons each day. By 1975 there were 17 "branch libraries" around the world.

The library collection has 2.4 million rolls of Family History Library microfilmed genealogical records and more than 742,000 microfiches in the main system. In 2003, the collection increased monthly by an average of 4,100 rolls of film, 700 books, and 16 electronic resources. A majority of the records contain information about persons who lived before 1930. Approximately 200 cameras are currently microfilming records in more than 45 countries. Records have been filmed in more than 110 countries, territories, and possessions.

The first Family History Center (FHC), then called a branch genealogical library, was organized in the Harold B. Lee Library on Brigham Young University Campus in May, 1964.  Plans to organize family history centers in Mesa, Arizona, Logan, Utah, Cardston, Alberta, and Oakland, California, each adjacent to a temples in one of those cities, had been announced at the 1963 October General Conference.

The Family History Centers were put under the overall direction of Archibald F. Bennett.  By December, 1964, there were 29 FHCs, and by 1968, there were 75. In 1987, these institutions were renamed "Family History Centers."

Familysearch.org databases

The Ancestral File database contains more than 36 million names that are linked into families.
The International Genealogical Index database contains approximately 600 million names of deceased individuals. An addendum to the International Genealogical Index contains an additional 125 million names. These names have been patron-submitted or extracted from thousands of original birth, christening, and marriage records.
The Pedigree Resource File database contains more than 80 million names that are linked into families. Records from the United States, Canada, the British Isles, Europe, Latin America, Asia, and Africa, are available.
The Social Security Death Index represents millions who were in the US Social Security system before death.
A majority of the records contain information about persons who lived before 1930.

Census records from the 1880 United States Federal Census and from the 1881 British & Canadian censuses are available.
A Vital Records Index presents thousands of names for Mexico and Scandinavia only.
Approximately 200 cameras are currently microfilming records in more than 45 countries. Records have been filmed in more than 110 countries, territories, and possessions.

In 2003, the collection increased monthly by an average of 4,100 rolls of film, 700 books, and 16 electronic resources.

Digitization and indexing projects

In the late 1990s, a "pilot program" to update familysearch.org and digitize its entire collection was started using volunteers to input or "index" census and other data. This new genealogical index is considered an upgrade. It is a work in progress representing 426 regions around the world. Millions of new names have been input by volunteers and volunteers for the project are being actively solicited at FamilySearchIndexing.org. The searchable database containing the digital images and index will be available through the LDS Church's FamilySearch website.

See also

Family History Research Wiki
Genealogical Society of Utah

References

External links
 FamilySearch.org  for information on  family history centers
 Family History Library Official Site
 Family History Library, Salt Lake City 
 Family History Library research wiki
 A complete list of all Family History Centers worldwide
 New York FHCs representing ward, stake and other Family History Centers in New York.
 Los Angeles Family History Library formerly known as the "Los Angeles Regional Family History Center" is now designated as the "Los Angeles FamilySearch Library" by the LDS Church, but is not referred to in that way by its supporting genealogical organizations and patrons (either LDS Church members or non-members). Click on this link to see that "Los Angeles Family History LIBRARY" is etched in stone at the library entrance!
 Regional FamilySearch Libraries The list of the 15 Regional FamilySearch Libraries.
 FamilySearch Indexing

Genealogy and the Church of Jesus Christ of Latter-day Saints
Genealogical libraries in the United States
History centers
Properties of the Church of Jesus Christ of Latter-day Saints
Latter Day Saint church buildings